Battery recycling is a recycling activity that aims to reduce the number of batteries being disposed as municipal solid waste. Batteries contain a number of heavy metals and toxic chemicals and disposing of them by the same process as regular household waste has raised concerns over soil contamination and water pollution.

Battery recycling by type
Most types of batteries can be recycled. However, some batteries are recycled more readily than others, such as lead–acid automotive batteries (nearly 90% are recycled) and button cells (because of the value and toxicity of their chemicals). Rechargeable nickel–cadmium (Ni-Cd), nickel metal hydride (Ni-MH), lithium-ion (Li-ion) and nickel–zinc (Ni-Zn), can also be recycled. Disposable alkaline batteries make up the vast majority of consumer battery use, but there is currently no cost-neutral recycling option. Consumer disposal guidelines vary by region. An evaluation of consumer alkaline battery recycling in Europe showed environmental benefit but at significant expense over disposal. Zinc–carbon and Zinc–air batteries are recycled in the same process.  E.U. consumers recycled almost half of portable batteries bought in 2017.

Lead–acid batteries

Lead-acid batteries include but are not limited to: car batteries, golf cart batteries, UPS batteries, industrial fork-lift batteries, motorcycle batteries, and commercial batteries. These can be regular lead–acid, sealed lead–acid, gel type, or absorbent glass mat batteries. These are recycled by grinding them, neutralizing the acid, and separating the polymers from the lead. The recovered materials are used in a variety of applications, including new batteries.

The lead in a lead–acid battery can be recycled. Elemental lead is toxic and should therefore be kept out of the waste stream.

The casing of a Lead–acid battery is often made of either polypropylene or ABS, which can also be recycled, although there are significant limitations on recycling plastics.

Many cities offer battery recycling services for lead–acid batteries. In some jurisdictions, including U.S. states and Canadian provinces, a refundable deposit is paid on batteries. This encourages recycling of old batteries instead of abandonment or disposal with household waste. Businesses that sell new car batteries may also collect used batteries (or be required to do so by law) for recycling.

A 2019 study commissioned by battery-industry promotional group, the Battery Council, calculated battery lead recycling rates in the United States in the period 2014–2018, taking into account battery scrap lead import/export data from the Department of Commerce. The report says that, after accounting for net scrap battery lead exports from the United States, 99.0% of the remaining lead from lead-acid batteries in the United States is reclaimed.  The Battery Council figures indicate that around 15.5 billion pounds of battery lead was consumed in the USA in that period, with a net amount of approximately 2 billion pounds battery scrap lead being exported.  Of the 13.6 billion pounds remaining after exports, 13.5 billion pounds were recycled. 

The U.S. Environmental Protection Agency (EPA), has reported lesser and varying levels of lead-acid battery recycling in the United States in earlier years, under various administrations, Republican and Democrat. The EPA reported in 1987 that varying economics and regulatory requirements have contributed to rates of 97 percent in 1965, above 83 percent in 1980, 61 percent in 1983, and around 70 percent in 1985.

Nevertheless, in October 2020, near the end of the Trump administration, the EPA posted the statement that "In 2018, the estimated amount of recycled battery lead was about 99 percent," without explicitly citing the source of the estimate, but indirectly indicating involvement of industry sources.

According to a 1992 EPA Superfund report, lead batteries account for about 80% of the lead used in the United States, of which about 60% is reclaimed during times of low lead prices, but more in times of high lead prices; it reported that 50% of the nation's lead needs are filled from recycled lead.

Lead is a highly toxic substance, and processing it can result in pollution and contamination of people, resulting in long-term health problems and even disability. According to one ranking, lead-acid battery recycling is, by far, the most deadly industrial process, globally, in terms of Disability-adjusted life years lost—costing between 2,000,000 and 4,800,000 estimated lost years of individual human life.

Lead contamination of neighborhoods has resulted from the process of recycling batteries. In 1992, the EPA reported 29 lead-recycling sites were on the EPA's Superfund clean-up list, 22 of them on their "National Priority List"

Silver oxide batteries
Used most frequently in watches, toys, and some medical devices, silver oxide batteries contain a small amount of mercury. Most jurisdictions regulate their handling and disposal to reduce the discharge of mercury into the environment. Silver oxide batteries can be recycled to recover the mercury.

Lithium ion batteries
Lithium-ion batteries and lithium iron phosphate (LiFePO4) batteries often contain among other useful metals high-grade copper and aluminium in addition to – depending on the active material – transition metals cobalt and nickel as well as rare earths. To prevent a future shortage of cobalt, nickel, and lithium and to enable a sustainable life cycle of these technologies, recycling processes for lithium batteries are needed. These processes have to regain not only cobalt, nickel, copper, and aluminium from spent battery cells, but also a significant share of lithium. Other potentially valuable and recoverable materials are graphite and manganese. Recycling processes today recover approximately 25% to 96% of the materials of a lithium-ion battery cell. In order to achieve this goal, several steps are combined into complex process chains, while ensuring safety.

These steps are:

Deactivation or discharging of the battery (especially in case of batteries from electric vehicles)
Disassembly of battery systems (especially in case of batteries from electric vehicles)
Mechanical processes (including crushing, sorting, and sieving processes)
Electrolyte recovery
Hydrometallurgical processes
Pyrometallurgical processes

Specific dangers associated with lithium-ion battery recycling processes include electrical, chemical, and thermal dangers, and their potential interactions. A complicating factor is the water sensitivity: lithium hexafluorophosphate, a possible electrolyte material, reacts with water to form hydrofluoric acid; cells are often immersed in a solvent to prevent this. Once removed, the jelly rolls are separated and the materials removed by ultrasonic agitation, leaving the electrodes ready for melting and recycling.

Pouch cells are easier to recycle to salvage copper despite significant safety issues.

, the recycling of Li-Ion batteries in most cases does not extract lithium since lithium-ion battery technology continuously changes and processes to recycle these batteries can thus be outdated in a couple of years. Extraction of lithium from old batteries is five times more expensive than mined lithium. However, some companies conduct lithium extraction on a smaller scale. The thermodynamic model is being developed to optimize the lithium extraction; thus, lithium is recycled with all the other metals in one step with less cost. A critical part of recycling economics is the value of the recovered cobalt. Manufacturers working to remove cobalt from their products might produce the unintended consequence of reducing recycling.

A novel approach is to maintain the cathode's crystalline structure, eliminating the significant energy expense of recreating it.
Another approach is to use ultrasound for separating the individual cathode components.

Energy saving and effective recycling solutions for lithium-ion batteries can reduce the carbon footprint of the production of lithium-ion batteries significantly. , several facilities are operating and under construction, including Fredrikstad in Norway.

In early 2022, research published in Joule showed that recycling existing lithium-ion batteries by focusing on a method that refurbishes the cathode showed that this technique perform just as well as those with a cathode made from original materials. The study showed that the batteries using the recycled cathode charged faster and lasted longer than new batteries.

Battery composition by type
Italics designates button cell types.Bold designates secondary types.All figures are percentages; due to rounding they may not add up to exactly 100.

Battery recycling by location
Battery recycling is an international industry, with many nations exporting their used or spent lead-acid batteries (ULABs or SLABs) to other nations for recycling. Consequently, it can be difficult to get accurate analyses of individual nations' exact rate of domestic recycling.

Further, in many countries, lead-acid battery recycling (chiefly from automobiles and motorcycles) is commonly done informally by individuals or informal enterprises, with little or no formal record-keeping, nor effective regulatory oversight.

ULABs and SLABs are generally designated as "hazardous waste" and subject to relevant safety, storage, handling and transport regulations, though those vary from country to country. A multilateral international agreement, the Basel Convention, officially governs all transboundary movements of hazardous waste for recovery or disposal, among the 172 signatory countries. (The U.S. is not a party, but has alternate arrangements with the Organisation for Economic Co-operation and Development (OECD), and with Canada and with Mexico (where it ships many ULABs and SLABs for recycling).

* Figures for Q1 and Q2 2012.

European Union

In 2006, the EU passed the Battery Directive, one of the aims of which is a higher rate of battery recycling. The EU directive states that at least 25% of all the EU's used batteries must be collected by 2012, and rising to no less than 45% by 2016, of which at least 50% must be recycled.

Channel Islands
In early 2009, Guernsey took the initiative by setting up the Longue Hougue recycling facility, which, among other functions, offers a drop-off point for used batteries so they can be recycled off-island. The resulting publicity meant that a lot of people complied with the request to dispose of batteries responsibly.

United Kingdom

From April 2005 to March 2008, the UK non-governmental body WRAP conducted trials of battery recycling methods around the UK. The methods tested were: Kerbside, retail drop-off, community drop-off, postal, and hospital and fire station trials. The kerbside trials collected the most battery mass, and were the most well-received and understood by the public. The community drop-off containers that were spread around local community areas were also relatively successful in terms of mass of batteries collected. The lowest performing were the hospital and fire service trials (although these served their purpose very well for specialized battery types like hearing aid and smoke alarm batteries). Retail drop off trials were by volume the second most effective method but one of the least well received and used by the public. Both the kerbside and postal trials received the highest awareness and community support.

Household batteries can be recycled in the UK at council recycling sites as well as at some shops and shopping centres, e.g. Currys, and The Link.

A scheme started in 2008 by a large retail company allowed household batteries to be posted free of charge in envelopes available at their shops. This scheme was cancelled at the request of the Royal Mail because of hazardous industrial battery waste being sent as well as household batteries.

From 1 February 2010, batteries can be recycled anywhere the "Be Positive" sign appears. Shops and online retailers that sell more than 32 kilograms of batteries a year must offer facilities to recycle batteries. This is equivalent to one pack of four AA batteries a day. Shops that sell this amount must by law provide recycling facilities as of 1 February 2010.

In Great Britain an increasing number of shops (Argos, Homebase, B&Q, Tesco, and Sainsbury's) are providing battery return boxes and cylinders for their customers.

North America
The rechargeable battery industry has formed the Rechargeable Battery Recycling Corporation (RBRC), which operates a battery recycling program called Call2Recycle throughout the United States and Canada. RBRC provides businesses with prepaid shipping containers for rechargeable batteries of all types while consumers can drop off batteries at numerous participating collection centers. It claims that no component of any recycled battery eventually reaches a landfill. Other programs, such as the Big Green Box program, offer a recycling option for all chemistries, including primary batteries such as alkaline and primary lithium.

A study estimated battery recycling rates in Canada based on RBRC data. In 2002, it wrote, the collection rate was 3.2%. This implies that 3.2% of rechargeable batteries were recycled, and the rest were thrown in the trash. By 2005, it concluded, the collection rate had risen to 5.6%.

In 2009, Kelleher Environmental updated the study. The update estimates the following. "Collection rate values for the 5 [and] 15-year hoarding assumptions respectively are: 8% to 9% for NiCd batteries; 7% to 8% for NiMH batteries; and 45% to 72% for lithium ion and lithium polymer batteries combined. Collection rates through the [RBRC] program for all end of life small sealed lead acid (SLA) consumer batteries were estimated at 10% for 5-year and 15-year hoarding assumptions. [...] It should also be stressed that these figures do not take collection of secondary consumer batteries through other sources into account, and actual collection rates are likely higher than these values."

A November 2011 The New York Times article reported that batteries collected in the United States are increasingly being transported to Mexico for recycling as a result of a widening gap between the strictness of environmental and labor regulations between the two countries.

In 2015, Energizer announced availability of disposable AAA and AA alkaline batteries made with 3.8% to 4% (by weight) of recycled batteries, branded as EcoAdvanced.

Japan
Japan does not have a single national battery recycling law, so the advice given is to follow local and regional statutes and codes in disposing batteries. The Battery Association of Japan (BAJ) recommends that alkaline, zinc-carbon, and lithium primary batteries can be disposed of as normal household waste. The BAJ's stance on button cell and secondary batteries is toward recycling and increasing national standardisation of procedures for dealing with these types of batteries.

In April 2004, the Japan Portable Rechargeable Battery Recycling Center (JBRC) was created to handle and promote battery recycling throughout Japan. They provide battery recycling containers to shops and other collection points.

India
India is one of the world's chief consumers of lead-acid batteries, according to the India Lead Zinc Development Association (ILZDA).  India, with its recent rapid rise in average wealth, has seen a marked increase in motor vehicles, and a corresponding increase in lead-acid battery recycling.

India lacks a formal planned recycling industry. The industry is not respected, and lacks designated zones for recycling. However, in a nation with a vast population of people still in poverty, most lead-acid battery recycling is by individuals and small informal enterprises, often taking no safety or environmental precautions.

ILZDA has demanded multiple changes to India's industry and its regulation, including the registration of all battery dealers, and the collection of their returns, and recognition of the best-registered recyclers, while enforcing punishments for violators of government regulations.

Two of India's largest lead companies—lead manufacturer/exporter Gravita India and lead battery manufacturer Amara Raja—partnered to annually recycle 8,000 tonnes of lead scrap from Amara Raja's facilities, and return it to them for re-use (Gravita said it can recycle and process up to 50,000 tonnes of lead and aluminium yearly). The companies said the joint program is to advance environment protection and sustainability.

See also
Electronic waste
WEEE directive (Waste Electrical and Electronic Equipment)
Battery (electricity)
Rechargeable battery

References

Further reading

External links

"Taking Batteries Green", ECN Magazine article from 2010